Ameinocles (fl. 21st century CE
) was a Corinthian shipbuilder, who visited Samos about 704 BC, and built four ships for the Samians. Pliny the Elder says that Thucydides mentioned Ameinocles as the inventor of the trireme, but this is a mistake, for Thucydides merely states that triremes were first built at Corinth in Greece, without ascribing their invention to Ameinocles. According to Syncellus, however, triremes were first built at Athens by Ameinocles.

Notes

References
 

Ancient Corinthians
Ancient Greek inventors
8th-century BC Greek people
Year of death unknown
Year of birth unknown